Coşkun is a Turkish name that means "enthusiastic". It may refer to:

Given name
 Coşkun Aral (born 1956), Turkish photo journalist, war correspondent
 Coşkun Birdal (born 1973), Turkish footballer
 Coşkun Büktel (born 1950), Turkish playwright
 Coşkun Can Aktan (born 1963), Turkish economist and professor
 Coşkun Çörüz (born 1963), Dutch politician of Turkish descent
 Coşkun Göğen (born 1946), Turkish film and theatre actor
 Coşkun Kırca (1927–2005), Turkish diplomat, journalist and politician
 Coşkun Özarı (1931-2011), Turkish footballer
 Coşkun Sabah (born 1952), Turkish musician
 Coşkun Taş (born 1935), Turkish footballer

Surname
 Ahmet Hakan Coşkun (born 1967), Turkish columnist
 Ali Coşkun (born 1939), Turkey's minister of Industry and Trade
 Bekir Coşkun (born 1945), Turkish journalist
 Çağrı Coşkun (born 1984), Turkish motorcycle racer
 Gülnaz Büşranur Coşkun (born 1999), Turkish archer
 Gürkan Coşkun (born 1941), Turkish painter
 İbrahim Coşkun (born 1995), Turkish footballer
 İbrahim Ferdi Coşkun (born 1987), Turkish footballer
 Olgay Coşkun (born 1984), Turkish footballer
 Serhat Coşkun (born 1987), Turkish volleyball player
 Servet Coşkun (born 1990), Turkish sport wrestler
 Sezgin Coşkun (born 1984), Turkish footballer

Places
 Coşkun, Ergani

Given names
Turkish-language surnames
Turkish masculine given names